The 1992 Railway Cup Hurling Championship was the 64th series of the inter-provincial hurling Railway Cup. Four matches were played between 14 March 1992 and 15 March 1992 to decide the title. It was contested by Connacht, Leinster, Munster and Ulster.

Connacht entered the championship as the defending champions, however, they were defeated by Ulster at the semi-final stage.

On 15 March 1992, Munster won the Railway Cup after a 3-12 to 1-08 defeat of Ulster in the final at Nowlan Park, Kilkenny. It was their 38th Railway Cup title overall and their first title since 1985.

Leinster's Eamon Morrissey was the Railway Cup top scorer with 2-05.

Results

Semi-finals

Shield final

Final

Top scorers

Overall

Sources

 Donegan, Des, The Complete Handbook of Gaelic Games (DBA Publications Limited, 2005).

References

Railway Cup Hurling Championship
Railway Cup Hurling Championship